Cléber Rodrigo Alves, commonly known as Cléber Alves is a Brazilian footballer who plays as a goalkeeper for Primavera.

Having largely featured as a reserve keeper, he did play as first choice in 2014 Campeonato Brasileiro Série B for Vila Nova Futebol Clube, making 32 appearances in a season which ended in relegation. He first played in the Brazilian national league system in 2013, representing Treze in 2013 Campeonato Brasileiro Série C.

References

External links
 

Living people
1986 births
Brazilian footballers
Association football goalkeepers
Mogi Mirim Esporte Clube players
Rio Claro Futebol Clube players
Treze Futebol Clube players
Vila Nova Futebol Clube players
Rio Branco Esporte Clube players
Capivariano Futebol Clube players
Barretos Esporte Clube players
Esporte Clube São Bento players
Grêmio Esportivo Brasil players
Campeonato Brasileiro Série B players
Campeonato Brasileiro Série C players